Dominic Presentation is a 1996 Indian Malayalam film, directed by Ramesh Das. The film stars Ashokan, Geetha, Vijayakumar and Indrans in the lead roles. The film has musical score by Vidyadharan.

Cast
Ashokan as James
Geetha as Indu Varma IPS
Vijayakumar as Dominic Presentation
Indrans as Velayudan
Rajan P. Dev as Marthandan Pilla
Shaju as Gopalakrishnan
Kalabhavan Navas
 Thalapathy Dinesh as Kumareshan
 Sathaar as Satheesh Chandran
 Bheeman Raghu as Amareshan
Mala Aravindan as Father Joseph Medayil
Azeez as D.I.G
Gomathi as Gomathi
Remadevi as Alice

Soundtrack
The music was composed by Vidyadharan and the lyrics were written by Kaithapram.

References

External links
 

1996 films
1990s Malayalam-language films
Films scored by Vidhyadharan